The Strettweg cult wagon, or Strettweg sacrificial wagon, or Strettweg chariot is a bronze cult wagon from ca. 600 BC, which was found as part of a princely grave of the Hallstatt culture in Strettweg near Judenburg, Austria in 1851.  Besides the wagon, other grave goods, like jewelry, bronze amphorae, iron weapons, and horse tack were found.

The wagon consists of a square, open-worked base plate with four spoked wheels. A female figure approx. 32 cm high extending her hands to touch the base of a large bowl with tall, X-shaped supports. Expert analysis has concluded that the bowl cannot be conclusively proven to originally have been part of the cult wagon  and may be a later addition. The wagon also contains numerous human figures, both standing and mounted, as well as animals similar to deer and horses. The scene has been interpreted as a sacrifice. The wagon presumably served as a cult object for the consumption of a libation.

The wagon was restored in 2009 and is on display in the Universalmuseum Joanneum at Eggenberg Palace, Graz.  A copy is on display in the museum in Judenburg.

According to Marjeta Šašel-Kos (2000), "A deer goddess similar to Artemis must have played an important role in pre-Celtic Noricum, as is indicated by the cult cart from Strettweg, from c. 600 B.C., which represents a goddess (or her priestess) who received deer as a sacrifice, i.e. a kind of a 'Great Nature Goddess'."

Gallery

References

Literature 
 Markus Egg: Neues zum Fürstengrab von Strettweg. 1991.
 Markus Egg, Gerhard Stawinoga: Das hallstattzeitliche Fürstengrab von Strettweg bei Judenburg in der Obersteiermark. Römisch-Germanisches Zentralmuseum, Forschungsinstitut für Vor- und Frühgeschichte, 1996,

External links 

 The Strettweg Chariot on the Joanneum website with photo
 aeiou Austria Encyclopedia website with photo

Graz
Archaeological discoveries in Austria
Archaeological discoveries in Europe
Tourist attractions in Styria
Ancient Celtic metalwork
Bronze sculptures in Austria
Iron Age Austria
1851 archaeological discoveries
Sculptures of women